Fathi Ahmad Hamad (also spelled Fathi Hammad; born 3 January 1961, Beit Lahia, northern Gaza) is a political leader of Hamas, a member of the Palestinian Legislative Council. In April 2009, he was appointed Interior Minister in the Hamas administered Gaza Strip, replacing Said Seyam who had been assassinated by Israel during the 2008-09 Gaza War. He ceased being Interior Minister in June 2014 on the formation of the Fatah-Hamas unity government.

In September 2016, Hamad was designated a terrorist by the US State Department and added to its global terrorist list, meaning that US citizens and companies are banned from doing business with him, and any property he holds in areas under US jurisdiction are frozen.

Career
Hamad became a Hamas-affiliated member of the Palestinian Legislative Council in 2006, representing his home town of Beit Lahia in northern Gaza. He also leads the Hamas Public Affairs Department and the chairman of al-Ribat Communications and Artistic Productions - a Hamas-run company which produces Hamas's radio station, Voice of al-Aqsa,  its television station, Al-Aqsa TV and its bi-weekly newspaper, The Message.

In 1983, Hammad joined the Muslim Brotherhood. He is the Founder and Vice President of Dar Al Quran.

In November 2009, Waad, a Gaza charity headed by Hamad, offered a $1.4 million bounty to any Arab citizen of Israel who abducts an Israeli soldier. While Palestinian militant groups have frequently called on Arab-Israelis to capture soldiers, this marked the first time money had been offered.

A speech made by Hamad, broadcast on Al-Aqsa TV in February 2008, has been used as evidence by Israel and others that Hamas and other Palestinian militant groups make use of human shields. In an interview which aired on Al-Aqsa TV on 14 December 2010 (as translated by MEMRI), Hamad stated that Hamas receives support.

In a speech broadcast on Egyptian Al-Helma TV on 23 March 2012, Hamad condemned Egypt over the fuel shortage in the Gaza Strip, and stated, "Half of the Palestinians are Egyptians and the other half are Saudis."

In March 2018, it was reported that Hamad is a senior Hamas official who opposes reconciliation with Fatah, and urges a resumption of war against Israel. He has been implicated in the assassination attempt on prime minister Rami Hamdallah.

In July 2019, Hamad urged members of the Palestinian diaspora to kill "Jews everywhere". His comments were characterized as incitement to genocide by Committee for Accuracy in Middle East Reporting in America and the Simon Wiesenthal Center. His rhetoric was widely condemned by other Palestinians and he later stated that he supports the Hamas policy of only targeting Jews in Israel.

Personal
Hamad's ill three-year-old daughter was sent to Jordan for medical treatment through the Israeli-controlled Erez Crossing. For initial medical treatment, she was first sent to Barzilai Hospital in the southern Israeli city of Ashkelon. Her subsequent transfer to Jordan was authorized by then Israeli defense minister Ehud Barak and the then IDF Chief of General Staff Gabi Ashkenazi, at the request of the Jordanian king Abdullah.

References

Living people
1961 births
Palestinian militants
Hamas members
People from the Gaza Strip
Members of the 2006 Palestinian Legislative Council
Government ministers of the Gaza Strip
Interior ministers of the Palestinian National Authority
Palestinian politicians
Mass media in the State of Palestine
Palestinian Legislative Council
Islamic University of Gaza alumni
Individuals designated as terrorists by the United States government
Individuals related to Iran Sanctions